Cannabis has been the subject of many hoaxes, urban legends and fake news.

Cannabis causes psychosis – no medical evidence has shown causation.
Monsanto GMO cannabis hoax – Purports that Monsanto has created genetically modified cannabis. Debunked by multiple sources including Monsanto with "standing denial" on "Myths About Monsanto" webpage.
Hash oil cures skin cancer – no medical evidence has shown causation.
 International Space Station cannabis experiment hoax – shows an image of astronaut Chris Hadfield holding a baggie of cannabis on the International Space Station
NASA marijuana experiments hoax – Purports that NASA has paid volunteers to smoke cannabis and lie in bed. NASA has never done the former, but has done the latter.
Planet X637Z-43 – Purports that NASA observed a planet covered in cannabis. No extraterrestrial life has ever been found.
Thomas Jefferson hemp smoking hoax – Purports that President Thomas Jefferson wrote about smoking hemp on his porch. He did not.
Hemp Levi's jeans urban legend – Purports that the first pair of Levi's jeans was made out of hemp. They were actually cotton canvas.
U.S. Constitution hemp paper hoax – Purports that the United States Constitution was written on hemp paper.
Pot brownies food stamps hoax – Purports that Supplemental Nutrition Assistance Program EBT card (food stamps) can be used to buy pot brownies.
No deaths attributed to cannabis – listed by California NORML as myth, due to elevated accident rates among users.
Marlboro M hoax – Purports that American Marlboro cigarettes containing cannabis have been produced in green labeled packages. The images of the packaging were created for fake news website Abril Uno (April one, i.e. April Fool's) in January, 2014 and covered by other fake news websites like Now 8 News.
The Nizari Ismaili were a Shia Muslim sect, founded in the 1080s, who earned a reputation as ruthless killers. They were known as hashishi, hashishiyya, or hashishiyyin (from the Arabic al-hasziszijjin, "hash-eaters"), whence the English word 'assassin' is derived. Westerners believed that consuming the drug put them into a murderous trance. No Islamic sources describe the Ismaili as consuming hash, and since the 20th century, historians have been of the opinion that the Ismaili were in reality never believed by their contemporaries to consume hash - instead, it was used as a term of abuse.  The myth or legend was repeated by Federal Bureau of Narcotics chief Harry Anslinger during his 1930s anti-cannabis campaigns.
McDonald's marijuana lounges – One of several McDonald's urban legends purports that the company's restaurants in Colorado are converting children's playgrounds to lounges for on-premises cannabis consumption. Circulated via Internet fake news sites since 2015, and has been disavowed by a McDonald's spokesperson.

References

Cannabis